Pachites is a genus of flowering plants in the orchid family, Orchidaceae. It contains two known species, both endemic to South Africa. One of these, Pachites appressus, is very rare.

Pachites was named by John Lindley in 1835. The name is derived from the Greek word pachys, meaning "thick, stout", and refers to the rostellum.

In Genera Orchidacearum volume 2, Pachites and Satyrium constitute the subtribe Satyriinae of the tribe Diseae. After that work was published in 2001, molecular phylogenetic studies showed that Pachites does not form a clade with Satyrium. Instead, Pachites occupies a basal position in Diseae. In spite of the papers published in 2008 and 2009, uncertainties remain over the exact relationships of Pachites to other genera. In a classification of orchids that was published in 2015, Pachites, Disa, and Huttonaea constitute the subtribe Disinae of the tribe Orchideae. This circumscription of Disinae, however, was done provisionally, to avoid creating new subtribes before further studies could determine, with increased certainty, the true affinities of these three genera.

Species 
 Pachites appressus John Lindley, 1835 – Langeberg Mountains
 Pachites bodkinii Harry Bolus, 1893 – Cape Province

See also 
 List of Orchidaceae genera

References

Sources 
 Berg Pana, H. 2005. Handbuch der Orchideen-Namen. Dictionary of Orchid Names. Dizionario dei nomi delle orchidee. Ulmer, Stuttgart

External links 
 Pachites  World Checklist of Selected Plant Families  Kew Gardens
 Pachites  Plant Names  IPNI
 page 301  View Book  The Genera and Species of Orchidaceous Plants  Titles  BHL
 CRC World Dictionary of Plant Names: D-L CRC World Dictionary of Plant Names: M-Q  Botany & Plant Science  Life Science  CRC Press
 page 48  Genera Orchidacearum volume 2  Genera Orchidacearum  Google Books 
 An updated classification of Orchidaceae (2015)  Botanical Journal of the Linnean Society  Wiley Online Library

Orchids of South Africa
Orchideae
Orchideae genera